Franz Frederik Wathén (30 March 1878 – 21 October 1914) was a Finnish speed skater.

Wathén became the first Finnish World Allround Champion in 1901 in Stockholm.

Records

Personal bests
 500 meter – 46,2
 1500 meter – 2.30,8
 5000 meter – 8.58,0
 10000 meter – 18.44,0

External links
 Franz Wathén – SchaatsStatistieken.nl
 Fredrik Wathén – SS – Person Bio
 Franz Wathén on SpeedSkatingStats.com

1878 births
1914 deaths
Finnish male speed skaters
World Allround Speed Skating Championships medalists
Sportspeople from Helsinki